Damu Cherry (born November 29, 1977, in Tampa, Florida) is an American hurdler. Her personal best time is 12.44 seconds, achieved in July 2006 in Lausanne.

Cherry competed for the University of South Florida in college. She finished seventh at the 2006 World Indoor Championships and second at the 2006 World Athletics Final. She qualified for the 2008 Olympic team and ended up taking fourth in the hurdles final.

References

External links
 
 
 

1977 births
Living people
American female hurdlers
African-American female track and field athletes
Olympic track and field athletes of the United States
Athletes (track and field) at the 2008 Summer Olympics
Doping cases in athletics
American sportspeople in doping cases
Sportspeople from Tampa, Florida
Track and field athletes from Florida
People from Winter Garden, Florida
Sportspeople from Orange County, Florida
University of South Florida olympians
South Florida Bulls women's track and field athletes
21st-century African-American sportspeople
21st-century African-American women
20th-century African-American sportspeople
20th-century African-American women
20th-century African-American people